Sørvær is a fishing village in Hasvik Municipality in Troms og Finnmark county, Norway. The village is located on the western tip of the island of Sørøya, looking out across the Lopphavet Sea. Sørvær Chapel is located in this village. The small village of Breivik lies about halfway along the road to Breivikbotn. In 2015, there were about 200 people who lived in Sørvær.

References

Villages in Finnmark
Populated places of Arctic Norway
Hasvik